This is a list of mosques in Cameroon.

See also
 Islam in Cameroon
 Lists of mosques

References

External links

 
Cameroon
Mosques